Abantis arctomarginata, the tricoloured paradise skipper, is a butterfly in the family Hesperiidae. It is found in Tanzania (from the south-central part of the country to Iringa) and Malawi.

The larvae feed on Uapaca kirkiana.

References

Butterflies described in 1901
Tagiadini